The lawn bowls competition at the 2002 Commonwealth Games took place in Heaton Park, Manchester, England from 25 July until 4 August 2002.

Medal table

Medallists

Para sport

Results

Men's singles 
Section A

Section B

Section C

Section D

Finals

Men's pairs 

Section A

Section B

Finals

Men's fours 
Results

Section A

Section B

Section C

Section D

Finals

Women's singles 

Section A

Section B

Section C

Section D

Finals

Women's pairs

Section A

Section B

Section C

Section D

Finals

Women's fours

Section A

Section B

Finals

References

See also
List of Commonwealth Games medallists in lawn bowls
Lawn bowls at the Commonwealth Games

Lawn bowls at the Commonwealth Games
2002 in bowls
Bow
Lawn bowls at the 2002 Commonwealth Games